Eric Robert Chenowith (born March 9, 1979) is an American former professional basketball player.

As a high school player, he was selected to the McDonald's All-American Team in 1997. He played collegiately for Kansas and was drafted by the New York Knicks in the 2nd round (43rd overall pick) of the 2001 NBA Draft.

Chenowith was under contract with the following NBA teams. The Knicks (June to September 2001), Sacramento Kings (October 2001), Seattle SuperSonics (September to October 2002), Los Angeles Clippers (October 2002), Los Angeles Lakers (August to October 2003), Denver Nuggets (October 2005), Chicago Bulls (October 2006) and New Orleans Hornets 2007. However, he never appeared in an NBA game (joining 7 other players from the 2001 NBA Draft to never play a game in the league).

Chenowith has played professionally for the Greenville Groove and Huntsville Flight (2001/02, NBDL), Pau-Orthez (2002, LNB, France), Huntsville Flight and Roanoke Dazzle (2002/03, NBDL), Orange County Crush (ABA) and Fujian Xunxing (China) (2004/05), Idaho Stampede (CBA) and Cangrejeros de Santurce (Puerto-Rico) (2005/06), Idaho Stampede (NBDL) and Criollos de Caguas (Puerto-Rico) (2006/07).

He currently resides in Corona del Mar, Newport Beach. More recently he captained Team Chenowith to a second-place finish in the 2016 McDonald's All-American Legends and Stars portion of the Powerade Jam Fest at the historic Chicago Theatre home of the final Rat Pack concert.

In 2018, Chenowith founded Leverage Disability, a health and life insurance brokerage, in Irvine, California.

References

External links
NBDL statistics

1979 births
Living people
American expatriate basketball people in China
American expatriate basketball people in France
American men's basketball players
Basketball players from California
Cangrejeros de Santurce basketball players
Centers (basketball)
Élan Béarnais players
Fujian Sturgeons players
Greenville Groove players
High school basketball coaches in California
Huntsville Flight players
Idaho Stampede players
Idaho Stampede (CBA) players
Insurance agents
Kansas Jayhawks men's basketball players
McDonald's High School All-Americans
New York Knicks draft picks
Parade High School All-Americans (boys' basketball)
Roanoke Dazzle players
Sportspeople from Orange, California
Criollos de Caguas basketball players